Seasons is a live, triple-LP album by multi-instrumentalist Alan Silva. It was recorded in December 1970 at ORTF Studio 104 in Paris, France, and was released in 1971 by BYG Records as part of their Actuel series. On the album, Silva is joined by a large ensemble known as the Celestrial Communication Orchestra.

The music recorded on Seasons came about when Silva was asked to organize a concert at short notice following a cancellation by Stan Getz. Silva assembled what he called "a once in a lifetime All Star Band," constructing the music "right there on the stage." The concert, which was broadcast live and well-recorded, was attended by an overflow crowd, and organizers had to set up speakers outside the hall. Silva recalled: "The engineers thought it was a fantastic challenge: unlimited sound density with no breaks, everybody had a cymbal, three pianos, all mixed down live to two channels. When I heard the tapes, I absolutely insisted they release it all, as a triple album."

Reception

In a review for AllMusic, Steve Loewy called the album a "remarkable gargantuan effort... for which the term 'masterpiece' is not too far a stretch," and wrote: "this is a magnificent, rambling, chaotic, lavish, and often meandering spectacle... It takes the concept of 'sheets of sound' to the next level... The results are absolutely thrilling, if not always inspiring, and there are many high points... the level of improvisation remains consistently at the highest levels. It is wild and free, and the listener receptive to free improvisation is likely to be held in rapturous attention. Destined to be a classic of its genre, Seasons offers a full-scale radical bombardment from many perspectives, resulting in a smorgasbord of delights."

Steve Moffic, writing for Jazz Digest, stated: "Seasons begins with a rumbling, rippling theme explored by three pianos... which suggests the forthcoming 'storm.' Strong solos by Joseph Jarman and Michel Portal on reeds and Silva on stringed instruments are highlights. The set is long, intense, lagging and wild."

Track listing
Composed by Alan Silva.

Disc 1
 "Seasons Part 1" – 25:12
 "Seasons Part 2" – 22:45

Disc 2
 "Seasons Part 3" – 23:15
 "Seasons Part 4" – 20:08

Disc 3
 "Seasons Part 5" – 26:08
 "Seasons Part 6" – 27:00

Personnel
 Alan Silva – bass, violin, sarangi
 Steve Lacy – soprano saxophone
 Michel Portal – alto saxophone, Clarinet
 Robin Kenyatta – alto saxophone, flute
 Ronnie Beer – tenor saxophone, soprano saxophone, flute
 Joseph Jarman – saxophone, flute, bassoon
 Roscoe Mitchell – saxophone, flute, oboe
 Alan Shorter – trumpet
 Lester Bowie – trumpet, flugelhorn
 Bernard Vitet – trumpet, French horn
 Dieter Gewissler – violin
 Jouk Minor – viola
 Kent Carter – cello
 Irene Aebi – cello, celeste
 Beb Guérin (credited as "bg") – bass
 Malachi Favors (credited as "mf") – bass
 Dave Burrell – piano
 Joachim Kühn – piano
 Bobby Few (credited as "bf") – piano
 Famoudou Don Moye – drums, percussion
 Jerome Cooper – drums, percussion
 Oliver Johnson – timpani, percussion

References

1971 live albums
Alan Silva live albums
BYG Actuel live albums
Live free jazz albums